If you are looking for a list of comic strips that appeared in The Beezer see List of Beezer comic strips, for a list that appeared in The Topper see List of Topper comic strips
In 1990 The Beezer merged with The Topper to form a new comic known as the Beezer and Topper. This new comic ended in 1993 after 153 issues. A number of characters from this comic went on to appear in either The Beano or The Dandy. The following is a list of all the strips that appeared in the Beezer and Topper, all numbers refer to issues of Beezer and Topper.

See also
List of Beano comic strips
List of Beano comic strips by annual
List of Dandy comic strips
List of Beezer comic strips

References

Comics anthologies
British comics
Beezer and Topper